The Nymphaeales are an order of flowering plants, consisting of three families of aquatic plants, the Hydatellaceae, the Cabombaceae, and the Nymphaeaceae (water lilies). It is one of the three orders of basal angiosperms, an early-diverging grade of flowering plants. At least 10 morphological characters unite the Nymphaeales. One of the traits is the absence of a vascular cambium, which is required to produce both xylem (wood) and phloem, which therefore are missing. Molecular synapomorphies are also known.

The Plant List, created by the Royal Botanic Gardens, Kew and Missouri Botanical Garden recognizes about 70 species in 11 genera within the order, but a phylogenetic study of the genus Nymphaea implies that the number of species could be more than 90. The difference in species numbers is due almost entirely to the difficulty of delineating species in the genus Nymphaea.

All of the species are rhizomatous aquatic herbs with a broad leaf base and large, showy flowers.

Fossils 
The fossil record consists especially of seeds, but also pollen, stems, leaves, and flowers. It extends back to the Cretaceous. The crown group of the Nymphaeales has been estimated to be about 112 million years old. Some have suggested that this age might be too old.

A basal member of Nymphaeales, Monetianthus, is known from Early Cretaceous Portugal. A fossil member of the Nympheaceae is Jaguariba from the Early Cretaceous of Brazil. Several Cretaceous-age Cabombaceae genera are also known, including Scutifolium from Jordan, Pluricarpellatia from Brazil, and Brasenites from Kansas. The fossil genus Notonuphar, thought to be a close relative of the modern Nuphar, is known from Eocene-aged sediments from Seymour Island, Antarctica. The aquatic plant fossil Archaefructus from the Early Cretaceous of Liaoning, China possibly also belongs to this group.

Classification 
The Nymphaeales currently include three families and about 70 to 90 species.

This order was not part of the APG II system's 2003 plant classification (unchanged from the APG system of 1998), which instead had a broadly circumscribed family Nymphaeaceae (including Cabombaceae) unplaced in any order. The APG III system did separate the Cabombaceae from the Nymphaeaceae and placed them in the order Nymphaeales together with the Hydatellaceae.  The family Hydatellaceae was placed among the monocots in previous systems, but a 2007 study found that the family belongs to the Nymphaeales. In the APG IV system, Hydatellaceae, Cabombaceae and Nymphaeaceae are the three families included in the Nymphaeales.

Some earlier systems, such as Cronquist's system of 1981, often included the Ceratophyllaceae and Nelumbonaceae in the Nymphaeales. Although, the Takhtajan system of 1980 separated the Nelumbonales, the new order was retained alongside the Nymphaeales in the superorder Nymphaeanae.

The Cronquist system placed the Nymphaeales in subclass Magnoliidae, in class Magnoliopsida [=dicotyledons].  In addition, Cronquist included the Ceratophyllaceae and split the family Barclayaceae from the Nymphaeaceae.  Under the APG II system, the family Cabombaceae was included within the Nymphaeaceae, but could optionally be recognized separately.  As of APG III, the two families are recognized separately.

The Dahlgren system placed the Nymphaeales with the Piperales in superorder Nymphaeanae, within subclass Magnoliideae (dicotyledons). Thorne's 1992 system (and 2000 revision) placed the Nymphaeales as the sole order in the superorder Nymphaeanae within subclass Magnoliideae (=dicotyledons).

References

Further reading 
 Michael G. Simpson. Plant Systematics. Elsevier Academic Press. 2006.
 Thomas N. Taylor, Edith L. Taylor, and Michael Krings. 2008. Paleobotany: The Biology and Evolution of Fossil Plants, Second Edition. Academic Press (an imprint of Elsevier): Burlington MA, USA.

External links 
 Nymphaeales At: Angiosperm Phylogeny Website At: botanical databases At: Plant Science At: Missouri Botanical Garden

 
Angiosperm orders
Early Cretaceous plants
Extant Early Cretaceous first appearances